This is a list of cartoonists, visual artists who specialize in drawing cartoons. This list includes only notable cartoonists and is not meant to be exhaustive.

Notable cartoonists

 Scott Adams, Dilbert
 Charles Addams (1938-1988), macabre cartoons featured in The New Yorker and elsewhere
 Attila Adorjany
 Sarah Andersen, known for Sarah's Scribbles
 Barry Appleby
 Sergio Aragonés, known for his contributions to Mad
 Graciela Aranis (1908-1996), Chilean painter, cartoonist
 Arotxa (Rodolfo Arotxarena)
 Jim Bamber, cartoonist of Autosport, magazine specialising in motor sports
 Edgar Henry Banger
 Carl Barks, inventor of Duckburg and many of its characters like Scrooge McDuck and Gladstone Gander; Fantagraphics Books called him "the Hans Christian Andersen of comic books."
 Sumanta Baruah
 Aminollah Rezaei
 Niko Barun
 Darrin Bell, Candorville and Rudy Park
 Steve Bell, The Guardian (UK)
 Stephen Bentley, "Herb and Jamaal"
 Oscar Berger, Aesop's Foibles (1947); active 1920s–1960s
 Mark Beyer, Amy and Jordan, Agony
 Brumsic Brandon Jr., "Luther"; with his daughter Barbara Brandon-Croft, first family of cartoonists (father/daughter) to each be nationally syndicated in the U.S. mainstream press
 Barbara Brandon-Croft, "Where I'm Coming From"; first Black woman cartoonist to be nationally syndicated in the U.S. mainstream press
 Berkeley Breathed, Bloom County and Outland
 Frédéric-Antonin Breysse
 Ed Brubaker
 Tom Bunk, cartoonist for Mad
 Mark Burrier
 John Byrne
 Al Capp, Li'l Abner
 Tom Cheney, staff cartoonist for The New Yorker
 Edgar Church
 Chester Commodore, political cartoonist
 George Cruikshank
 Isaac Cruikshank
 Isaac Robert Cruikshank
 Robert Crumb, Mr. Natural, Fritz the Cat, Keep on Truckin'
 Natalie d'Arbeloff
 Jack Davis
 Jim Davis, Garfield
 Abner Dean
 Arifur Rahman
 Narayan Debnath, Indian cartoonist known for Handa Bhonda, Bantul the Great, and Nonte Phonte
 Richard Decker, The New Yorker
 Walt Disney, Mickey Mouse, Donald Duck
 Ralph Waddell Douglass
 Stan Drake
 George du Maurier, also the author of Trilby
 Robert W. Edgren, American political cartoonist known for his "Sketches from Death" from the Spanish–American War
 Will Eisner, The Spirit
 Otto Eppers
 Charles Evenden
 Lyonel Feininger, rare fine artist who did strips, The Kin-der-Kids and Wee Willie Winkie's World
 Rod Filbrandt
 David Fletcher
 Ellen Forney
 André François
 André Franquin, Spirou et Fantasio, Gaston Lagaffe, Marsupilami
 Yuliy Abramovich Ganf, Soviet Russian
 Eddie Germano
 Denis Gifford, strips in Whizzer and Chips, Knockout, Marvelman
 Carl Giles
 James Gillray, called "the father of the political cartoon".
 John Glashan, Genius
 Rube Goldberg, cartoons of complex and convoluted machines doing very simple tasks.
 Larry Gonick, The Cartoon History of the Universe series, Kokopelli & Company
 Cleven "Goodie" Goudeau, known for his pioneering Afrocentric images on greeting cards
 Jimmy Gownley, Amelia Rules! series, Simon & Schuster
 Bud Grace, "Ernie/Piranha Club"
 Mel Graff, “The Adventures of Patsy”,  “Secret Agent X-9”
 Matt Groening, Life in Hell, The Simpsons, Futurama
 Sam Gross, for his The New Yorker work, plus many other magazines
 Shekhar Gurera, well known for his accurate prick of quirky cartoons at India's political and social trends
 William Haefeli
 Martin Handford, Where's Wally?
 Steven Harris
 Andrew Kennaway Henderson
 Henfil, Brazilian cartoonist
 Hergé, The Adventures of Tintin
 George Herriman, Krazy Kat
 Herblock American cartoonist
 Watson Heston
 Stephen Hillenburg (1961-2018), SpongeBob SquarePants
 Bill Hinds, "Tank McNamara"
 Dick Hodgins, Jr.
 William Hogarth, English pictorial satirist and editorial cartoonist; credited with pioneering western sequential art; work ranged from realistic portraiture to comic strip
 Bill Holbrook, On the Fastrack, Safe Havens, and Kevin and Kell
 Nicole Hollander, Sylvia
 John Holmstrom
 Geoff "Jeff" Hook, Australian
 George William Houghton, British golf cartoonist
 Jim Hummel
 Edgar Pierre Jacobs, Blake and Mortimer
 Al Jaffee, Mad
 Kirk Jarvinen
 S. Jithesh, World's Fastest Performing Cartoonist
 Herbert Johnson
 Mike Judge, Beavis and Butt-head, King of the Hill, The Goode Family
 Arja Kajermo
 Avi Katz
 Bil Keane, "Family Circus"
 Jeff Keane. "Family Circus"
 Walt Kelly, Pogo
 Rik Kemp
 Molly Kiely
 Wyncie King
 Jeff Kinney, Diary of a Wimpy Kid
 Rick Kirkman, "Baby Blues"
 Heinrich Kley
 B. Kliban
 John Kricfalusi, The Ren & Stimpy Show
 Gary Larson, The Far Side
 Rick Law, Beyond the Veil
 R K Laxman, cartoonist for The Times of India, India
 Ravindra K Rane, non-commercial cartoonist , India
 Mell Lazarus. "Momma, Miss Peach"
 John Leech, 19th-century Punch cartoonist
 Jonathan Lemon, Alley Oop
 Michael Leunig, Australian
 Arnold Levin
  David Low, New Zealand political cartoonist and caricaturist
 David Liljemark
 Neil Lonsdale (1907–1989), New Zealand editorial cartoonist
 Jay Lynch
 Trey Parker and Matt Stone, South Park
 Seth MacFarlane, Family Guy, American Dad!, The Cleveland Show
 Butch Hartman, The Fairly OddParents, T.U.F.F. Puppy, Danny Phantom, Bunsen Is a Beast
 Manjul, India Today, The Economic Times and Daily News and Analysis
 Bob Mankoff, The New Yorker
 Jack Markow
 Enrico Mazzanti
 Scott McCloud, Zot!, Understanding Comics
 Aaron McGruder, The Boondocks
 Ronald Michaud
 Yevgeniy Migunov
 Mario Miranda, The Economic Times, India
 Shigeru Mizuki, Ge Ge Ge no Kitaro, master of horror of Japanese manga
 Guillermo Mordillo
 Lorin Morgan-Richards
 Morris, Lucky Luke
 Joe Murray, Rocko's Modern Life and Camp Lazlo!
 Rachel Nabors
 Ogden Nash
 Nigar Nazar, first female cartoonist of the Muslim world, creator of cartoon character "Gogi"
 Roy Nelson
 Mana Neyestani, Iranian cartoonist
 Ajit Ninan, India Today and The Times of India
 Floyd Norman
 Murray Olderman, sports columnist, author of 14 books, National Cartoonist Society Sports Cartoon Award for 1974 and 1978
 Jack Edward Oliver
 Jackie Ormes, "Torchy Brown in 'Dixie to Harlem", "Candy", "Patty-Jo 'n' Ginger", "Torchy in 'Hearbeats'"; first Black woman cartoonist to be published nationally in the U.S. (not via syndication)
 Bruce Ozella
 Paul Palnik, American Jewish cartoonist
 Gary Panter
 Virgil Franklin Partch, known as "VIP;" leading American gag cartoonist from the 1940s to the 1980s
 Alan Stuart Paterson, New Zealand cartoonist
 Andrea Pazienza
 René Pellos, French cartoonist
 Bob Penuelas, Wilbur Kookmeyer
 Camillus Perera
 Bruce Petty
 Peyo, The Smurfs, Steven Strong, Johan and Peewit
 S. D. Phadnis, Indian cartoonist
 Ziraldo Alves Pinto; Brazilian cartoonist
 Hugo Pratt, Corto Maltese
 Ken Pyne
 Quino (Joaquín Salvador Lavado), Argentine cartoonist and social satirist, known for Mafalda
 Jacki Randall
 Roy Raymonde, English cartoonist whose work appeared principally in Punch (magazine) and Playboy
 W. Heath Robinson, British satirist known for drawings of convoluted machines, similar to Rube Goldberg
 Christine Roche
 Artie Romero
 Ed "Big Daddy" Roth
 Thomas Rowlandson
 Martin Rowson
 Øystein Runde
 Malik Sajad Indian cartoonist, author of graphic novel Munnu - A Boy from Kashmir'''
 Armando Salas
 Gerald Scarfe ( political) 
 Jerry Scott, "Baby Blues, Zits" 
 Ronald Searle, St Trinians, Molesworth, The Rake's Progress, editorial work
 Elzie Crisler Segar, Popeye Sempé
 Claude Serre
 James Affleck Shepherd
 Lee Sheppard
 Gilbert Shelton
 Mahmoud Shokraye
 Shel Silverstein
 Posy Simmonds, The Silent Three of St Botolph's, Gemma Bovery Siné
 Jeff Smith, Bone, RASL, Shazam!: The Monster Society of Evil, Little Mouse Gets Ready Mauricio de Sousa, Monica's Gang, Chuck Billy 'n' Folks, The Cavern Clan Art Spiegelman, author of Maus; co-editor of RAW magazine
 Dan Spiegle
 George Sprod, Punch and other publications
 Ralph Steadman, editorial cartoonist and book illustrator
 Ralph Stein
 Saul Steinberg
 Jay Stephens
 Matt Stone, with Trey Parker, co-creator of South Park Jakob Martin Strid
 Ed Subitzky, known for his National Lampoon work, also The New York Times Joost Swarte, Dutch comic artist known for his ligne claire or clear line style of drawing
 Betty Swords
 Les Tanner, political cartoonist
 Howard Tayler, pioneered web-cartooning as a profession
 Raina Telgemeier
 Osamu Tezuka, Astro Boy, Phoenix; known as the "God" of Japanese manga who defined modern Japanese cartooning
 Bal Thackeray, formed a political party in India
 Lefred Thouron
 Morrie Turner, credited with the first multicultural syndicated cartoon strip
 Albert Uderzo, Asterix Jim Unger, Canadian cartoonist: Herman Willy Vandersteen, Spike and Suzy, De Rode Ridder Joan Vizcarra
 Vicco von Bülow, Loriot Keith Waite, New Zealand-born English editorial cartoonist
 Mort Walker, Beetle Bailey, Hi and Lois Arthur Watts
 Ben Wicks, Canadian cartoonist and illustrator: The Outsider, Wicks S. Clay Wilson, Zap Comix, Underground Comix Shannon Wright
 Rhie Won-bok
 Bianca Xunise, "Six Chix"; first nonbinary cartoonist to be nationally syndicated in the U.S. mainstream press
 Art Young
 José Zabala-Santos
 Zapiro

 Cartoonists of comic strips 

 Scott Adams, Dilbert Alex Akerbladh
 Bill Amend, FoxTrot George Baker, Sad Sack Tom Batiuk, Funky Winkerbean Murray Ball, Footrot Flats Darrin Bell, Candorville, Rudy Park Stephen Bentley, "Herb and Jamaal"
 Jerry Bittle
 Boulet, pseudonym of French cartoonist Gilles Roussel
 Brumsic Brandon Jr., "Luther"
 Barbara Brandon-Croft, "Where I'm Coming From"
 Berkeley Breathed, Bloom County (1980s American social-political), Outland, Opus Dave Breger, Mister Breger Dik Browne, Hi and Lois, Hägar the Horrible Ernie Bushmiller, Nancy Milton Caniff, Terry and the Pirates, Steve Canyon Al Capp, Li'l Abner Ad Carter, Just Kids Jok Church, You Can With Beakman and Jax Francis Cleetus, It's Geek 2 Me Mitch Clem, Nothing Nice to Say, San Antonio Rock City Darby Conley, Get Fuzzy Joan Cornellà
 Dave Coverly, Speed Bump Max Crivello
 Stan Cross, The Potts Stacy Curtis, Cul de Sac Lyman Dally, Max Rep Harry Grant Dart
 Lou Darvas
 Jim Davis, Gnorm Gnat, Garfield, U.S. Acres, a Mr. Potato Head comic strip
 Reginald Ben Davis
 Derf Backderf (John Backderf)
 Brad Diller
 J. C. Duffy, The Fusco Brothers Edwina Dumm
 Frank Dunne
 Benita Epstein, Six Chix Larry Feign, The World of Lily Wong Norm Feuti, Retail George Fett, Sniffy and Norbert Charles Fincher, creator of Thadeus & Weez and The Daily Scribble Bud Fisher, Mutt and Jeff Ham Fisher, Joe Palooka Evelyn Flinders, The Silent Three Harold Rudolf Foster, Prince Valiant and Tarzan J.D. Frazer, User Friendly David Füleki, 78 Tage auf der Straße des Hasses Paul Gilligan, Pooch Cafe Erich von Götha de la Rosière
 Chester Gould, Dick Tracy Bud Grace, "Ernie/Piranha Club", "Babs and Aldo"
 Mel Graff, “The Adventures of Patsy”, “Secret Agent X-9”
 Bill Griffith, Zippy the Pinhead Cathy Guisewite, Cathy Nicholas Gurewitch, Perry Bible Fellowship Alex Hallatt
 Johnny Hart, B.C., The Wizard of Id Bill Hinds, Tank McNamara, Cleats, Buzz Beamer Bill Holman, Smokey Stover Daniel Hulet
 Billy Ireland
 Tatsuya Ishida, Sinfest Tove and Lars Jansson, The Moomins Ferd Johnson, Moon Mullins Kerry G. Johnson, Harambee Hills, caricaturist and children's book illustrator
 Russell Johnson, Mister Oswald Lynn Johnston, For Better or For Worse Eric Jolliffe, Andy Bil Keane, Family Circus Jeff Keane, Family Circus Walt Kelly, Pogo James Kemsley, Ginger Meggs Hank Ketcham, Dennis the Menace Kazu Kibuishi, Copper Frank King, Gasoline Alley Rick Kirkman, "Baby Blues"
 Keith Knight, The K Kronicles Charles Kuhn, Grandma Fred Lasswell, Barney Google Mell Lazarus, "Momma, Miss Peach"
 Virginio Livraghi
 Les Lumsdon, "Basil", "Nipper", "Caspar"
 Edgar Martin
 Clifford McBride, Napoleon Winsor McCay, Little Nemo Patrick McDonnell, Mutts Brian McFadden, Big Fat Whale Aaron McGruder, creator of the controversial strip The Boondocks George McManus, Bringing Up Father Caesar Meadows
 Dale Messick, Brenda Starr Tim Molloy
 Bill Murray, Sonny Boy Fred Negro, Pub Strip Chris Onstad, Achewood Jackie Ormes, "Torchy Brown in 'Dixie to Harlem'", "Torchy in 'Heartbeats'"
 Phil Ortiz
 Frode Øverli, Pondus Nina Paley, Nina's Adventures, Fluff, The Hots Brant Parker, The Wizard of Id Stephan Pastis, Pearls Before Swine Charles Peattie and Russell Taylor, Alex Mike Peters, Mother Goose & Grimm Keats Petree
 Stan Pitt, Larry Flynn, Detective Vic Pratt
 Dariush Ramezani
 John Rivas, Bonzzo Leigh Rubin, Rubes Warren Sattler, Grubby, Billy the Kid and Yang, as well as contributing artist for Barnaby daily, The Jackson Twins, Bringing Up Father and Hi and Lois Charles M. Schulz, Peanuts, Young Pillars Jerry Scott, "Baby Blues, Zits, Nancy" 
 Caroll Spinney, Harvey Lee W. Stanley, The Old Home Town Kris Straub, Starslip Crisis, Checkerboard Nightmare Henry Matthew Talintyre
 Harold Tamblyn-Watts
 Russell Taylor and Charles Peattie, Alex Richard Thompson, Cul de Sac Jim Toomey, Sherman's Lagoon Harry J. Tuthill, The Bungle Family Gustave Verbeek, The Upside Downs, The Terrors of the Tiny Tads Mort Walker, Beetle Bailey, Hi and Lois Bill Watterson, Calvin and Hobbes Bob Weber, Moose & Molly Monty Wedd, Ned Kelly Alex Williams, Queen's Counsel Tom Wilson, Ziggy Cartoonists of single-panel cartoons 

 Charles Addams
 Gene Ahern
 Glen Baxter
 Belsky
 Rupert Besley
 Charles Boyce, Compu-Toon Barry Bradfield
 Sheree Bradford-Lea
 Bo Brown
 Ivan Brunetti
 John Callahan
 Irwin Caplan
 Patrick Chappatte (Chappatte)
 Roz Chast
 Chumy Chúmez
 Mariza Dias Costa
 Wilbur Dawbarn
 Chon Day
 Donelan
 Denise Dorrance
 Nick Downes
 Mort Drucker
 Vladimir Flórez
 Stanley Arthur Franklin
 Carl Giles (Giles), Daily Express Ted Goff
 Bud Grace
 Sam Gross
 Dick Guindon
 William Haefeli
 Jessica Hagy
 Baron Halpenny
 Sidney Harris
 William Haselden
 Bill Hoest
 Judy Horacek
 Stan Hunt
 Hank Ketcham
 Ted Key
 John F. Knott, creator of Old Man Texas, Dallas Morning News, 1905-1957 
 Clyde Lamb
 Gary Larson
 Mel Lazarus
 Robert Leighton
 George Lichty
 Mike Lynch
 Lorin Morgan-Richards
 Fred Neher
 John Norment
 Don Orehek
 Jackie Ormes, "Candy", "Patty-Jo 'n' Ginger"
 W. B. Park
 Virgil Partch
 Dave Pascal
 Mad Peck
 Matt Percival
 Martin Perscheid
 Josefina Tanganelli Plana
 Gardner Rea
 John Reiner
 Dan Reynolds
 Mischa Richter
 Victoria Roberts
 Burr Shafer
 Vahan Shirvanian
 Chris Slane
 Grant Snider
 Dan Steffan
 James Thurber
 Jerry Van Amerongen
 H. T. Webster
 Gluyas Williams
 J. R. Williams, Out Our Way Gahan Wilson
 George Wolfe
 Kevin Woodcock
 Bianca Xunise
 Bill Yates
 ZAK, pseudonym of Belgian cartoonist Jacques Moeraert
 Zero

 Cartoonists of comic books 

 Carlo Ambrosini
 Jack Herbert
 Sergio Aragones, Mad; creator of Groo Daniel A. Baker
 Ken Battefield
 Bill Benulis, War is Hell Dawn Best
 Steve Bialik
 François Bourgeon, Le Cycle de Cyann Anna Brandoli
 Reg Bunn
 Ben Caldwell, creator of the Dare Detectives
 Aldo Capitanio
 Onofrio Catacchio
 Domitille Collardey
 Carlo Cossio, Dick Fulmine Jason Craig
 Hugleikur Dagsson
 Dame Darcy, creator of Meat Cake Patryck de Froidmont
 Gianni De Luca, Commissario Spada Dan DeCarlo, Archie, Josie and the Pussycats, Sabrina, the Teenage Witch Kim Deitch creator of Waldo the Cat and comic novels
 Vince Deporter, DC Comics; Nickelodeon, Spirou (Belgium)
 Julie Doucet, creator of Dirty Plotte, My New York Diary Will Elder, Mad, Little Annie Fanny in Playboy Steve Fiorilla, mini-comics
 Andy Fish
 Brad W. Foster, creator of Mechthings mini-comics, The Mechthings, Adventures of Olivia mini-comics
 Chandra Free
 Vernon Grant, creator of The Love Rangers Dick Hafer
 Marc Hansen, creator of Ralph Snart
 Los Bros Hernandez, creators of Love and Rockets Don Hillsman II
 Yvonne Hutton
 Al Jaffee, Mad, Snappy Answers to Stupid Questions Robyn E. Kenealy
 Helena Klakocar
 Andrea Kruis
 Harvey Kurtzman, founding editor of Mad Antonio Lara de Gavilán
 Selena Lin
 Craig McKay
 Mark Marderosian
 David Messer, adaptations of Macbeth and the Tempest Erika Moen
 Colonel Moutarde
 Art Nugent
 Gaman Palem
 Fung Chin Pang
 Power Paola
 Eduardo Vañó Pastor
 Craig Phillips
 Darren Sanchez
 Seth, creator of Palookaville Ravi Shankar
 Pran Kumar Sharma, Chacha Chaudhary Jeff Smith, Bone Book Cal Sobrepeña
 Fermín Solís
 Hans Steinbach
 Kazimir Strzepek
 Ramon Torrents
 Przemysław Truściński
 Jhonen Vasquez, Johnny the Homicidal Maniac, Squee!, I Feel Sick, Everything Can be Beaten, Fillerbunny, Bad Art Collection, Happy Noodle Boy Wally Wood, Mad Chao Yat
 Carlos Zéfiro

 Cartoonists of action/superhero comic books 

 Kyle Baker, creator of Why I Hate Saturn Barry Bradfield, Batman: The Animated Homepage Greg Brooks
 Jack Cole, creator of Plastic Man, later set the style for cartoons in Playboy Alan Davis, creator of ClanDestine
 Steve Ditko, creator of many Marvel Comics, including Spider-Man and Doctor Strange, with editor Stan Lee
 Will Eisner, creator of The Spirit, teacher, publisher, one of the first to popularize the term graphic novel, in his book A Contract with God Bob Kane, creator of The Batman with writer Bill Finger
 Jack Kirby, creator of Captain America with his partner Joe Simon, and many other comics
 Erik Larsen, creator of Savage Dragon Jim McDermott
 Shawn McManus
 Mike Mignola, creator of Hellboy Frank Miller, creator of Sin City James O'Barr, creator of The Crow Paul Palnik, creator of The God of Cartoons Roberto Raviola, creator of La Compagnia della Forca Shelby Robertson
 Alberto Saichann
 Horacio Sandoval
 Dave Sim, creator of Cerebus
 Jeff Smith, creator of Bone''
 Ed Tourriol
 Alain Voss
 Andres Manuel Labrada

See also

 Editorial cartoons
 Indian Institute of Cartoonists
 List of American comics creators
 List of animators
 List of editorial cartoonists
 List of illustrators
 List of newspaper comic strips
 List of manga artists
 List of comic strips

References

List

Cartooning-related lists
Lists of artists by medium
Lists of comics creators